Douékiré  is a village and commune of the Cercle of Goudam in the Tombouctou Region of Mali.

References

External links
. This document gives the area of the commune as 4,500 km2.

Communes of Tombouctou Region